The Body Corporate is a 1983 Australian television film directed by Eric Taylor and starring Leonard Teale, Pat MacDonald, and Mervyn Drake.

References

External links
The Body Corporate at IMDb

Australian television films
1980s English-language films
1983 films
1983 television films
1980s Australian films